Naveen Saini is an Indian television actor. He has done many roles in many Indian television series, like Kaahin Kissii Roz, Sapna Babul Ka... Bidaai, Aise Karo Naa Vidaa, Emergency Task Force, Rishton Ke Bhanwar Mein Uljhi Niyati, Madhubala – Ek Ishq Ek Junoon, Balika Vadhu, Aur Pyaar Ho Gaya, Savdhaan India, Box Cricket League, Code Red, Aahat.

Television
Star Plus
Kaahin Kissii Roz, 
Kasauti Zindagii Kay - 2001 Series
Sapna Babul Ka... Bidaai and 
Emergency Task Force
Colors TV
Aise Karo Naa Vidaa,   
Madhubala – Ek Ishq Ek Junoon,  
Balika Vadhu,  
Code Red,  
Shakti - Astitva Ke Ehsaas Ki and  
Kuch Toh Hai: Naagin Ek Naye Rang Mein  

Sahara One
Rishton Ke Bhanwar Mein Uljhi Niyati
Zee TV
Aur Pyaar Ho Gaya and
Kundali Bhagya
Life OK
Savdhaan India
Sony TV
Box Cricket League and
Aahat

References

External links

Living people
Indian male television actors
Male actors in Hindi television
Indian television personalities
Actors from Mumbai
Year of birth missing (living people)